The Eerste Klasse is the third highest domestic cricket competition in the Netherlands. Eight teams play in the regular competition. Although the direct translation from the Dutch name to English would be "First Class", it is not associated with what is recognised as first class cricket by the International Cricket Council.

Competition Structure
There are 8 teams which play the first phase as a round robin home and away league. The second phase is played in two groups - the top four compete to be promoted to the Hoofdklasse while the bottom four compete to avoid relegation to the Overgangsklasse.

Previous years
From 2010 onwards, the KNCB renamed the leagues, the older 'Eerste Klasse' was changed to 'Hoofdklasse'. The Eerste Klasse champions for the recent years are shown below.

References

External links
 KNCB schedule and results for 2017 Eerste Klasse season

Cricket in the Netherlands
Dutch domestic cricket competitions

nl:Eerste klasse (cricket)